Group C of the 2021 FIFA Arab Cup took place from 1 to 7 December 2021. The group consisted of Morocco, Saudi Arabia, Jordan and Palestine.

The top two teams, Morocco and Jordan, advanced to the quarter-finals.

Teams

Standings 

In the quarter-finals:
Morocco advanced to play against Algeria (runners-up of Group D).
Jordan advanced to play against Egypt (winners of Group D).

Matches

Morocco vs Palestine 

Assistant referees:
Tevita Masakini (Tonga)
Bernard Mutukera (Solomon Islands)
Fourth official:
Saíd Martínez (Honduras)
Video assistant referee:
Shaun Evans (Australia)
Assistant video assistant referees:
Juan Soto (Venezuela)
Ezequiel Brailovsky (Argentina)
Eber Aquino (Paraguay)

Saudi Arabia vs Jordan 

Assistant referees:
Djibril Camara (Senegal)
Elvis Noupué (Cameroon)
Fourth official:
Wilton Sampaio (Brazil)
Video assistant referee:
Jair Marrufo (United States)
Assistant video assistant referees:
Fernando Guerrero (Mexico)
Paweł Sokolnicki (Poland)
Tomasz Kwiatkowski (Poland)

Jordan vs Morocco 

Assistant referees:
Ezequiel Brailovsky (Argentina)
Gabriel Chade (Argentina)
Fourth official:
Alireza Faghani (Iran)
Video assistant referee:
Juan Soto (Venezuela)
Assistant video assistant referees:
Rafael Traci (Brazil)
Jun Mihara (Japan)
Leodán González (Uruguay)

Palestine vs Saudi Arabia 

Assistant referees:
Walter López (Honduras)
Christian Ramírez (Honduras)
Fourth official:
Janny Sikazwe (Zambia)
Video assistant referee:
Fernando Guerrero (Mexico)
Assistant video assistant referees:
Eber Aquino (Paraguay)
Rafael Foltyn (Germany)
Jair Marrufo (United States)

Morocco vs Saudi Arabia 

Assistant referees:
Martín Soppi (Uruguay)
Carlos Barreiro (Uruguay)
Fourth official:
Saíd Martínez (Honduras)
Video assistant referee:
Leodán González (Uruguay)
Assistant video assistant referees:
Eber Aquino (Paraguay)
Jerson Dos Santos (Angola)
Shaun Evans (Australia)

Jordan vs Palestine 

Assistant referees:
Mohammadreza Abdolfazl (Iran)
Paweł Sokolnicki (Poland)
Fourth official:
Wilton Sampaio (Brazil)
Video assistant referee:
Abdulla Al-Marri (Qatar)
Assistant video assistant referees:
Jair Marrufo (United States)
Rafael Foltyn (Germany)
Christian Dingert (Germany)

Notes

References

External links
 

2021 FIFA Arab Cup
2021–22 in Moroccan football
2021–22 in Saudi Arabian football
2021–22 in Jordanian football
2021–22 in Palestinian football